is a professional Japanese baseball player.

References

External links

1974 births
Living people
Baseball people from Hiroshima Prefecture
Senshu University alumni
Japanese baseball players
Nippon Professional Baseball pitchers
Hiroshima Toyo Carp players
Japanese baseball coaches
Nippon Professional Baseball coaches